= Cundi Park =

Park in Istanbul, Turkey

- Cundi Parkı
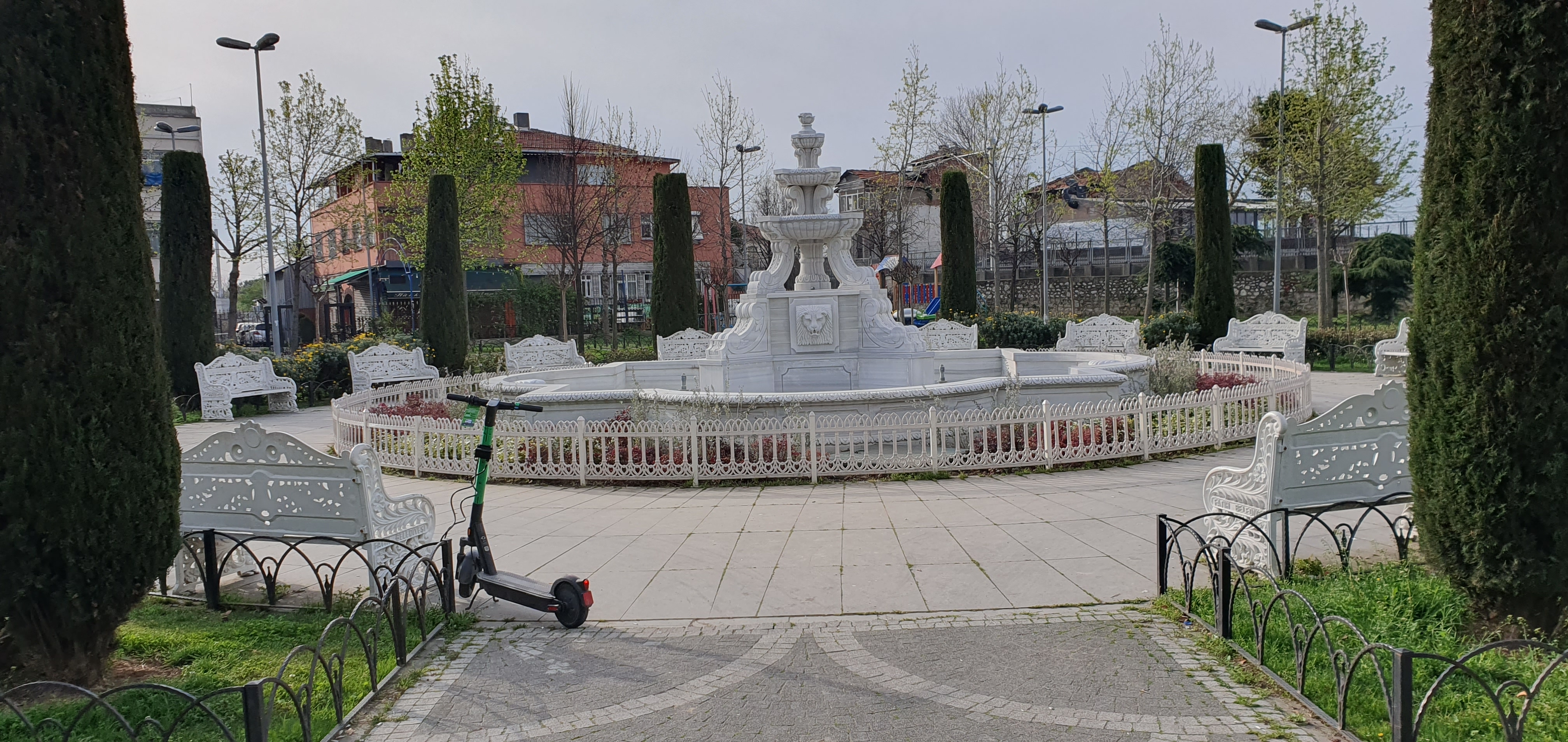
- Fountain in the park, 2023
- Location: Istanbul, Turkey
- Coordinates: 41°00′11″N 28°58′12″E

Cundi Park (Turkish: Cundi Parkı) is a park in Istanbul, Turkey.
